Sistema is a Russian conglomerate company.

Sistema may also refer to:
Sistema (Russian politics), a term for endemic corruption
Sistema Plastics, a New Zealand plastic container company
El Sistema, a music education programme founded in Venezuela
Sistema, an Italian term for a staff (music)

See also 
 
 Systema (disambiguation)
 System (disambiguation)